The 20th Utah Senate District is located in Weber County and includes Utah House Districts 6, 7, 8, 9, 11 and 12. The current State Senator representing the 20th district is Gregg Buxton. Buxton was elected to the Utah Senate in 2016 and re-elected in 2020.

Previous Utah State Senators (District 20)

Election results

2020 General Election

See also

 Utah Democratic Party
 Utah Republican Party
 Utah Senate

Footnotes

External links
 Utah Senate District Profiles
 Official page of D. Gregg Buxton

20
Weber County, Utah